A lazma (plural: lazmāt) is an instrumental interlude within a vocal performance in Arabic music.

References

Arabic music
Breaks
Instrumentals
Musical compositions
Musical techniques
Popular music
Song forms